Mingus Moves is an album by the jazz composer and bassist Charles Mingus, released in 1973.

The music 

Mingus Moves (Atlantic SD 1653) is one of the late works of American jazz bassist, composer, and bandleader Charles Mingus. He hired three new musicians for the recording: Don Pullen on piano; Ronald Hampton on trumpet, and George Adams on tenor saxophone. Drummer Dannie Richmond, a stalwart of Mingus's bands in the 1950s and '60s, rejoined the band on the first day of recording after not working with the bassist for several years.

The album, although not generally regarded as one of Mingus's best, does feature three remarkable compositions: "Canon", "Opus 3", and "Opus 4". "Canon" is a theme, as the title suggests, that can be superimposed upon itself. The song has a spiritual character, à la Coltrane, and is played with a warm sound by Pullen and Adams. This tune was also released on Hal Willner's tribute CD: Weird Nightmare - Meditations on Mingus. "Opus 3" is based on the Mingus's 1957 composition "Pithecanthropus Erectus", in which certain sections are played without key or meter restrictions. "Opus 4" is a straight-ahead swinger that features Don Pullen playing a free solo part.

The other tunes include "Moves", a composition written and sung (along with Honi Gordon) by Doug Hammond, Richmond's predecessor; "Wee", composed and arranged by Sy Johnson, who also worked with Mingus on Let My Children Hear Music (1971) and Charles Mingus and Friends in Concert (1972); "Flowers", written by Adams; and "Newcomer" by Pullen, dedicated to his newborn daughter.

The CD released in 1993 contains the bonus tracks "Big Alice" and "The Call", which were recorded during the same sessions.

Track listing
(All compositions by Mingus except where noted.)
"Canon" – 5:28
"Opus 4" – 6:39
"Moves" (Doug Hammond) – 3:43
"Wee" (Sy Johnson) – 8:57
"Flowers for a Lady" (George Adams)– 6:44
"Newcomer" (Don Pullen) – 7:13
"Opus 3" – 10:26
"Big Alice" (Don Pullen) – 5:44 (bonus track)
"The Call" – 7:13 (later credited Ronald Hampton as writer)

Personnel 
 Ronald Hampton - Trumpet
 Doug Hammond – Vocals
 Honi Gordon - Vocals
 George Adams - Tenor sax, Flute
 Dannie Richmond - Drums
 Don Pullen - Piano
 Charles Mingus – Bass

References

External links
Nat Hentoff: Liner Notes for Mingus Moves (Atlantic)
Paula Edelstein in allaboutjazz 
Andrew Homzy, in: Charles Mingus, More Than a Fake Book. Hal Leonard Corporation 1991 

1973 albums
Charles Mingus albums
Albums produced by Nesuhi Ertegun
Atlantic Records albums